Diana Chioma Eneje (born August 19, 2002), known professionally as Diana Eneje, is a Nigerian fashion enthusiasts, model, vlogger and Social media personality, born and raised in Lagos, and hails from Enugu, a state in the south-east region of Nigeria. She is known for starring in  Rema music video Dumebi

Early life
Diana Chioma Eneje was born on  August 19, 2002 in Lagos to Kingsley Eneje, and Linda Eneje. Her early influence in fashion, came from her eldest sisters Jennifer Eneje, and Doris Eneje, who inspired her fashion taste, while growing up.

Career
In 2016, she started her career in modeling as a teen model, at the age of 14. On 19 August 2017, she launched her foundation, to support orphans. Eneje started a fashion vlog on YouTube in August 2019. She documents fashion, hair, food, and her travel experiences. On 19 August 2019, she launched her hair gel collection in collaboration with The Shine Cartel. She also appeared in Rema music video Dumebi, released by Jonzing World, and Mavin Records on 21 May 2019, as the lead character in the video.

Eneje has influenced for HP, Cadbury, PayPorte, Mango, Stanbic IBTC, Krispy Kreme, Kellogg Tolaram, Infinix, Bolt, Coca Cola, Octafx and much more. On 18 June 2020, she spoke about her career, as an influencer on Guardian TV, with Popsicles host Emmanuella .

On 19 August 2021, Swarovski, a  jewelry and accessories company in Nigeria, unveiled Diana, as its brand influencers.

Accolades

References

2002 births
Living people
People from Enugu State
Residents of Lagos
Models from Lagos
Nigerian fashion businesspeople
21st-century Nigerian women
Fashion YouTubers
21st-century businesspeople
21st-century Nigerian businesspeople
Nigerian female models
Nigerian YouTubers